Achyra bifidalis is a moth in the family Crambidae. It was described by Johan Christian Fabricius in 1794. It is found from the southern United States (from Arizona to Florida) south through Mexico to Brazil and Argentina. It is also found in the West Indies.

The larvae feed on Gossypium and Portulaca species. They reach a length of 24–27 mm.

References

Moths described in 1794
Moths of North America
Moths of South America
Pyraustinae
Taxa named by Johan Christian Fabricius